Charles Freer Andrews (12 February 1871 – 5 April 1940) was an Anglican priest and Christian missionary, educator and social reformer, and an activist for Indian independence. He became a close friend of Rabindranath Tagore and Mahatma Gandhi and identified with the Indian liberation struggle. He was instrumental in convincing Gandhi to return to India from South Africa, where Gandhi had been a leading light in the Indian civil rights struggle.

C. F. Andrews was affectionately dubbed Christ's Faithful Apostle by Gandhi, based on his initials, C.F.A. For his contributions to the Indian independence movement, Gandhi and his students at St. Stephen's College, Delhi, named him Deenabandhu, or "Friend of the Poor".

Early life

Charles Freer Andrews was born on 12 February 1871 at 14 Brunel Terrace, Newcastle upon Tyne, Northumberland, United Kingdom. His father, John Edwin Andrews, was the "Angel" (bishop) of the Catholic Apostolic Church in Birmingham. Charles was one of 14 children. The family had suffered financial misfortune because of the duplicity of a friend, and had to work hard to make ends meet. Andrews was a pupil at King Edward's School, Birmingham, and afterwards read Classics at Pembroke College, Cambridge. During this period he moved away from his family's church and was accepted for ordination in the Church of England.

In 1896 Andrews became a deacon, and took over the Pembroke College Mission in south London. A year later he was made priest, and became Vice-Principal of Westcott House Theological College in Cambridge.

In India

Andrews had been involved in the Christian Social Union since university, and was interested in exploring the relationship between a commitment to the Gospel and a commitment to justice, through which he was attracted to struggles for justice throughout the British Empire, especially in India.

In 1904 he joined the Cambridge Mission to Delhi and arrived there to teach philosophy at St. Stephen's College, where he grew close to many of his Indian colleagues and students. Increasingly dismayed by the racist behaviour and treatment of Indians by some British officials and civilians, he supported Indian political aspirations, and wrote a letter in the Civil and Military Gazette in 1906 voicing these sentiments. Andrews soon became involved in the activities of the Indian National Congress, and he helped to resolve the 1913 cotton workers' strike in Madras.

With Gandhi in South Africa
Known for his persuasiveness, intellect and moral rectitude, he was asked by senior Indian political leader Gopal Krishna Gokhale to visit South Africa and help the Indian community there to resolve their political disputes with the Government. Arriving in January 1914, he met the 44-year-old Gujarati lawyer, Mohandas Gandhi, who was leading the Indian community's efforts against the racial discrimination and police legislation that infringed their civil liberties. Andrews was deeply impressed with Gandhi's knowledge of Christian values and his espousal of the concept of ahimsa (nonviolence) – something that Gandhi mixed with inspiration from elements of Christian anarchism.

Andrews served as Gandhi's aide in his negotiations with General Jan Smuts and was responsible for finalizing some of the finer details of their interactions.

Following the advice of several Indian Congress leaders and of Principal Susil Kumar Rudra, of St. Stephen's College, Andrews was instrumental in persuading Gandhi to return to India with him in 1915.

Tagore and Narayana Guru
In 1918 Andrews disagreed with Gandhi's attempts to recruit combatants for World War I, believing that this was inconsistent with their views on nonviolence. In Mahatma Gandhi's Ideas Andrews wrote about Gandhi's recruitment campaign: "Personally I have never been able to reconcile this with his own conduct in other respects, and it is one of the points where I have found myself in painful disagreement."

Andrews was elected President of the All India Trade Union in 1925 and 1927.

Andrews developed a dialogue between Christians and Hindus. He spent a lot of time at Santiniketan in conversation with the poet and philosopher Rabindranath Tagore. He also supported the movement to ban the ‘untouchability of outcasts’. In 1919 he joined the famous Vaikom Satyagraha, and in 1933 assisted B.R. Ambedkar in formulating the demands of the Dalits.

He and Agatha Harrison arranged for Gandhi's visit to the UK. He accompanied Gandhi to the second Round Table Conference in London, helping him to negotiate with the British government on matters of Indian autonomy and devolution.

In Fiji 
When the news reached India, through the writings of Christian missionaries J. W. Burton, Hannah Dudley, and R. Piper and a returned indentured labourer, Totaram Sanadhya, of the mistreatment of Indian indentured labourers in Fiji, the Indian Government in September 1915 sent Andrews and William W. Pearson to make inquiries. The two visited numerous plantations and interviewed indentured labourers, overseers and Government officials and on their return to India also interviewed returned labourers. In their "Report on Indentured Labour in Fiji" Andrews and Pearson highlighted the ills of the indenture system; which led to the end of further transportation of Indian labour to the British colonies. In 1917 Andrews made a second visit to Fiji, and although he reported some improvements, was still appalled at the moral degradation of indentured labourers. He called for an immediate end to indenture; and the system of Indian indentured labour was formally abolished in 1920.

In 1936, while on a visit to Australia and New Zealand, Andrews was invited to and visited Fiji again. The ex-indentured labourers and their descendants wanted him to help them overcome a new type of slavery, by which they were bound to the Colonial Sugar Refining Company, which controlled all aspects of their lives. Andrews, however, was delighted with the improvements in conditions since his last visit, and asked Fiji Indians to "remember that Fiji belonged to the Fijians and they were there as guests."

Later life
About this time Gandhi reasoned with Andrews that it was probably best for sympathetic Britons like himself to leave the freedom struggle to Indians. So from 1935 onwards Andrews began to spend more time in Britain, teaching young people all over the country about Christ's call to radical discipleship. Gandhi's affectionate nickname for Andrews was Christ’s Faithful Apostle, based on the initials of his name, "C.F.A". He was widely known as Gandhi's closest friend and was perhaps the only major figure to address Gandhi by his first name, Mohan.

Charlie Andrews died on 5 April 1940, during a visit to Calcutta, and is buried in the 'Christian Burial ground' of Lower Circular Road cemetery, Calcutta.

Commemoration
He is widely commemorated and respected in India. Two undergraduate colleges of the University of Calcutta, the Dinabandhu Andrews College, and the Dinabandhu Institution and one High School in Salimpur area of south Kolkata commemorate his name. The Dinabandhu Andrews College was constituted with an aim of disseminating higher education to a huge number of children of the displaced persons from erstwhile East Pakistan, presently Bangladesh. Even in South India, he was remembered by naming hospitals as Deenabandhu. One such was Deenabandhu Hospital, Thachampara, Palakkad, Kerala.

In 1948, Joseph John, pastor in Katpadi, was so inspired by Gandhis and C.F. Andrews‘ ideas, that he left his ministry to serve the poor and casteless in a remote area in Chittoor district of Andhra Pradesh and founded a village/ Rural Life Centre, which he called Deenabandupuram.

Andrews was a major character, portrayed by British actor Ian Charleson, in the 1982 film, Gandhi, by Richard Attenborough. He is honored with a Lesser Feast on the liturgical calendar of the Episcopal Church in the United States of America on February 12.

In 1971, India issued a commemorative postage stamp to mark the birth centenary of Andrews.

Publications
 Hakim Ajmal Khan A sketch of his life and career. Madras: G. A. Natesan. (1922)
 The Relation of Christianity to the Conflict between Capital and Labour (1896)
 The Renaissance in India: its Missionary Aspect (1912)
 
 Christ and Labour (1923)
 Mahatma Gandhi His Life and Works (1930) republished by Starlight Paths Publishing (2007) with a foreword by Arun Gandhi
 What I Owe to Christ (1932)
 The Sermon on the Mount (1942)

See also
 Delhi Brotherhood Society

References

Further reading
 D. O'Connor, Gospel, raj and swaraj: the missionary years of C. F. Andrews 1904–14 (1990)
 H. Tinker, The Ordeal of Love: C. F. Andrews and India (1979)
 Deenabhandu Andrews Centenary Committee, Centenary Volume C. F. Andrews 1871–1971 (1972)
 P. C. Roy Chaudhuri, C. F. Andrews his life and times (1971)
 K. L. Seshagiri Rao, Mahatma Gandhi and C. F. Andrews: a study in Hindu-Christian dialogue (1969) 
 Banarsidas Chaturvedi & Marjorie Sykes, Charles Freer Andrews: a Narrative (1949)
 J. S. Hoyland, The Man India Loved: C. F. Andrews [1944]
 N. Macnicol, C. F. Andrews Friend of India (1944)
 J. S. Hoyland, C. F. Andrews : minister of reconciliation (London, Allenson, [1940])
 David McI Gracie, Gandhi and Charlie: The story of a Friendship (1989)
 Visvanathan, Susan, "S K Rudra, C F Andrews and M K Gandhi: Friendship, Dialogue and Interiority in the Question of Indian Nationalism", Economic and Political Weekly, Vol – XXXVII No. 34, 24 August 2002
 Visvanathan, Susan.2007. Friendship, Interiority and Mysticism: Essays in Dialogue. New Delhi:Orient BlackSwan

External links

 
Charles Freer Andrews materials in the South Asian American Digital Archive (SAADA)

1871 births
1940 deaths
Alumni of Pembroke College, Cambridge
Alumni of Westcott House, Cambridge
Anglican pacifists
Anglican saints
Anglican socialists
British expatriates in Fiji
British people in colonial India
Christian radicals
English Christian pacifists
English Christian socialists
British social reformers
Staff of Westcott House, Cambridge
Academic staff of Visva-Bharati University
People associated with Santiniketan
Founders of Indian schools and colleges
Scholars from Kolkata